Christoph Neuhold (born 27 April 1994) is an Austrian handball player for ASV Hamm-Westfalen and the Austrian national team.

He participated at the 2018 European Men's Handball Championship.

References

1994 births
Living people
Austrian male handball players
Expatriate handball players
Austrian expatriate sportspeople in Germany